Banyuasin is a regency of South Sumatra Province in Indonesia. It takes its name from the main river which stream that area, Banyuasin River. Pangkalan Balai is the regency seat. The regency borders Musi Banyuasin Regency, Jambi province and Bangka Strait to the north, Bangka Strait to the east, Ogan Komering Ilir Regency, Muara Enim Regency, and Palembang to the south, and Musi Banyuasin Regency to the west. It has an area of 11,832.99 km2 and had a population of 749,107 at the 2010 census and 836,914 at the 2020 census. Much of the regency is coastal lowland.

Administrative districts

As at 2010, the Banyuasin Regency was subdivided into fifteen districts (kecamatan), subsequently increased by six to twenty-one districts which are listed below with their areas (as at 2018, following the re-organisation of districts) and their populations at the 2010  and 2020 censuses. The table also includes the location of the district administrative centres.

Notes:
(a) 2010 population included in figure for Betung and Banyuasin III districts, from parts of which it was created in 2011.
(b) 2010 population included in figure for Pulau Rimau district, from part of which it was created.
(c) 2010 population included in figure for Banyuasin III district, from part of which it was created in 2011.
(d) 2010 population included in figure for Banyuasin I and Rambutan districts, from parts of which it was created in 2012.
(e) 2010 population included in figure for Banyuasin II district, from part of which it was created.
(f) 2010 population included in figure for Muara Telang district, from part of which it was created in 2016.

References

Regencies of South Sumatra